Eugene Fitzgerald (21 August 1932 – 14 December 2007) was an Irish Fianna Fáil politician who served as Minister for Finance from 1980 to 1981, Minister for the Public Service from 1980 to 1981 to March 1982 to December 1982, Minister for Labour from 1977 to 1980 and March 1982 to December 1982. He served as a Teachta Dála (TD) from 1972 to 1987. He was a Member of the European Parliament (MEP) for the Munster constituency from 1984 to 1994.

Gene Fitzgerald was born in Crookstown, County Cork in August 1932. He was educated nearby in Cork at the Presentation Brothers College. Fitzgerald was first elected to Dáil Éireann in a by-election in 1972. He remained as a Fianna Fáil TD for the constituency of Cork South-Central for 15 years. He was also involved in local politics, serving as a member of Cork County Council from 1974 until 1977. Fitzgerald was also vice-president of the Cork County Board of the Gaelic Athletic Association.

Fitzgerald was first appointed to the Irish Government in 1977 when he became Minister for Labour under Jack Lynch. He backed George Colley in the 1979 Fianna Fáil leadership election but retained his office under the eventual victor, Charles Haughey. His appointment as Minister for Finance in 1980 caused some political commentators to be taken aback, particularly because of his political inexperience and also Fitzgerald had never been named as a possible Finance Minister. From then on he backed Haughey in the leadership heaves of 1982.  In Haughey's second government Fitzgerald returned to the position of Minister for Labour.

Fitzgerald contested the 1984 European election in the Munster constituency and won a seat. He remained a TD until he stood down at the 1987 general election to concentrate on European politics instead of national politics. He was re-elected as an MEP in the 1989 elections. Fitzgerald retired from public office at the 1994 election, although he remained involved in the Fianna Fáil party as a Treasurer and subsequently as Honorary Secretary.

References

External links

 

 

  
 

  

 

  

1932 births
2007 deaths
Fianna Fáil TDs
Ministers for Finance (Ireland)
Politicians from County Cork
Members of the 19th Dáil
Members of the 20th Dáil
Members of the 21st Dáil
Members of the 22nd Dáil
Members of the 23rd Dáil
Members of the 24th Dáil
Fianna Fáil MEPs
MEPs for the Republic of Ireland 1989–1994
MEPs for the Republic of Ireland 1984–1989
People educated at Presentation Brothers College, Cork